Adu Gyamfi Senior High School is a public senior high school located at Jamasi in the Sekyere East District of the Ashanti Region of Ghana.

See also
 Education in Ghana
 List of schools in Ghana

References

Ashanti Region
High schools in Ghana
Public schools in Ghana